WAVA is a Religious Talk formatted broadcast radio station licensed to Arlington, Virginia, serving the Washington, D.C. and Baltimore, Maryland metro areas.  WAVA is owned and operated by Salem Media Group. In its early history, the station sported pop, country and news/talk formats. As WARL, it was the first station to brand itself as playing "country western music."  

WAVA is a daytime-only station because 780 AM is a clear-channel frequency on which WBBM is the dominant Class A station.

References

External links
 AM780 WAVA Online

1947 establishments in Virginia
Talk radio stations in the United States
Radio stations established in 1947
Salem Media Group properties
AVA
AVA
Arlington County, Virginia